Alan Paul Bell (January 18, 1932 – May 13, 2002) was an American psychologist who worked at the Kinsey Institute.

Bell was born in Newark, New Jersey on January 18, 1932. He earned an undergraduate degree from University of the South and a master's degree from General Theological Seminary. In 1964 he earned a doctorate from Columbia University. He was the father of violinist Joshua Bell.

Selected works
 The Personality of a Child Molester: An Analysis of Dreams (1971)
 Homosexuality: An Annotated Bibliography (1972)
 Homosexualities: A Study of Diversity Among Men and Women (1978)
 Sexual Preference (1981)

References 

1932 births
2002 deaths
20th-century American psychologists
Sewanee: The University of the South alumni
Columbia University alumni
People from Newark, New Jersey
General Theological Seminary alumni
American psychologists